Wang Yaqiao (2 September 1887 – 20 September 1936) was a Chinese gangster and assassin leader.

Biography 

Wang was born Hefei, Anhui Province, to a country doctor. He was involved in socialist activism in his youth, which eventually brought him into trouble with regional warlords and forced him to leave Anhui and settle in Shanghai in 1913. Here, Wang became a labor organizer, but also founded the Anhui Gang, a criminal organization involved in drug trafficking and assassination. The Anhui Gang was often employed by the warlord Lu Yongxiang. For a time, Wang mentored Dai Li, who would later become Chiang Kai-shek's secret police chief, but Dai became disillusioned after 1923 when Wang arranged the assassination of police chief Xu Guoliang, who was attempting to suppress his drug trafficking operations.

In 1924, Lu Yongxiang's forces were defeated by Qi Xieyuan and from then on Wang's Anhui Gang was often employed by the New Guangxi clique. During the 1930s, Wang became notorious as "the king of assassins" for masterminding the killing of numerous Japanese servicemen and figures associated with China's puppet Nationalist government during Japanese occupation. He was linked to assassination attempts on T. V. Soong in 1931 and Wang Jingwei in 1935.

Wang eventually became one of China's most wanted criminals. For a time, he evaded the police in Hong Kong, but later escaped to Wuzhou. On November 21, 1936, he was assassinated in Wuzhou, though it remains unclear whether his killers were agents of the Nationalist government or members of the New Guangxi clique who wanted to cut ties with him.

Bibliography 
 

1880s births
1936 deaths
Chinese assassins
Chinese gangsters
Chinese crime bosses
Deaths by firearm in China
Assassinated Chinese people